Eberhard Kneisl (12 May 1916 – 26 December 2008) was an Austrian alpine skier. He competed in two events at the 1948 Winter Olympics.

References

1916 births
2008 deaths
Austrian male alpine skiers
Olympic alpine skiers of Austria
Alpine skiers at the 1948 Winter Olympics
Sportspeople from Tyrol (state)
20th-century Austrian people